The Indonesian Archipelago geographically stretches across four time zones from UTC+06:00 in Aceh to UTC+09:00 in Papua.  However, the Indonesian government recognises only three time zones in its territory, namely:
Western Indonesia Time (WIB) — seven hours ahead (UTC+07:00) of the Coordinated Universal Time (UTC);
Central Indonesia Time (WITA) — eight hours ahead (UTC+08:00) of UTC;
Eastern Indonesia Time (WIT) — nine hours ahead (UTC+09:00) of UTC.
The boundary between the Western and Central time zones was established as a line running north between Java and Bali through the provincial boundaries of West and Central Kalimantan.  The border between the Central and Eastern time zones runs north from the eastern tip of Indonesian Timor to the eastern tip of Sulawesi.

Daylight saving time (DST) is no longer observed anywhere in Indonesia.

Current usage
In Indonesia, the keeping of standard time is divided into three time zones:

These time zones were first observed on 1 January 1988 (according to Presidential Decree 41/1987).  Prior to that date, West and Central Kalimantan used WITA, while Bali belonged to WIB (since 29 November 1963).

Historical usage
During the colonial era, the time zones in Indonesia (Dutch East Indies) were regulated as follows:

Standardised Time Zone (Indonesia 1932)

Western parts of Indonesia observed 30 minute daylight saving time (DST) from 1 November 1932 to 23 March 1942, and from 23 September 1945 to 1 January 1964 (except from 1 May 1948 to 1 May 1950, which observed 1 hour daylight saving time instead).  West and Central Borneo also observed 1 hour DST from 1 January 1964 to 1 January 1988.  Eastern Indonesia observed 30 minute DST from 1 September 1944 until 1 January 1964.  Furthermore, 20 minute daylight saving time was observed in Java and Sumatra from 1 January 1924 to 1 November 1932.

From 23 March 1942 to 23 September 1945, both western and central parts of Indonesia used Japan Standard Time (JST) (UTC+09:00) for the sake of the effectiveness of Japanese military operations in Indonesia  This meant that western parts of Indonesia observed 2 hour daylight saving time, and central parts of Indonesia observed 1 hour daylight saving time during the period of Japanese occupation 1942 to 1945.

Proposal for a single time zone

IANA time zone database
The IANA time zone database contains four zones for Indonesia in the file zone.tab.
Asia/Jakarta
Asia/Pontianak
Asia/Makassar
Asia/Jayapura

See also
ASEAN Common Time
Philippine Standard Time
Singapore Standard Time
Time in Malaysia
Time in Thailand
Time in South Korea
Japan Standard Time
Time in China

References

External links
Indonesian Standard Time

 
Time in Southeast Asia